Fernando Gomes Martins, Ph.D. in chemical engineering, is a Portuguese chemist, who is active in the field of multivariate statistical methods and models; he is an associate professor (FEUP) at the laboratory for process engineering, environment, biotechnology and energy (LEPABE) of the University of Porto and senior researcher and coordinator of the research group "Process Systems Engineering".

See also 
 Roman M. Balabin

References

Literature 
 Jing-Han Wang, Lin-Lan Zhuang, Xue-Qiao Xu, Victor M. Deantes-Espinosa, Xiao-Xiong Wang. Microalgal attachment and attached systems for biomass production and wastewater treatment // Renewable and Sustainable Energy Reviews. — 2018. — September (vol. 92). — P. 331–342. — ISSN 1364-0321. — DOI:10.1016/j.rser.2018.04.081.
 Jiří Jaromír Klemeš, Petar Sabev Varbanov, Timothy G. Walmsley, Xuexiu Jia. New directions in the implementation of Pinch Methodology (PM) // Renewable and Sustainable Energy Reviews. — 2018. — December (vol. 98). — P. 439–468. — ISSN 1364-0321. — DOI:10.1016/j.rser.2018.09.030.

Web-sources 
 

Living people
Portuguese chemists
Academic staff of the University of Porto
Year of birth missing (living people)